The Negrișoara is a left tributary of the river Neagra Broștenilor in Romania. It flows west to east through the Bistrița Mountains, and flows into the Neagra Broștenilor southwest of Broșteni.

References

Rivers of Romania
Rivers of Suceava County